Koogle Kuttappa is a 2022 Indian Tamil-language science fiction comedy-drama film directed by debutants Sabari–Saravanan and produced by K. S. Ravikumar under the RK Celluloids banner and co-produced by Kallal Global Entertainment. The film stars Ravikumar himself with Tharshan, Losliya, and Yogi Babu in prominent roles. The film's music is composed by Ghibran, with cinematography handled by Arvi and editing done by Praveen Antony.

The film is a remake of the 2019 Malayalam film Android Kunjappan Version 5.25 which itself inspired by the 2012 American movie "Robot & Frank". The film was released on 6 May 2022.

Cast 

 K. S. Ravikumar as Subramani Gounder
 Tharshan Thiyagarajah as Aadhi
 Losliya Mariyanesan as Tharani
 Ilambarathi and Bommi as Koogle Kuttappa (voice actor Savitha Reddy) 
 Yogi Babu as Babu
 Pavitra Lokesh as Pavithra
 'Prankster' Rahul as Rahul
 Poovaiyar as Babu's friend
 Suresh Chandra Menon as Humanoid Dynamics CEO
 G. Marimuthu as Municipal officer
 Pandi as Rahul's friend
 Manobala as doctor
 Pavitra Lokesh as Pavithra
 R. Parthiban as the narrator

Production 
Sabari and Saravanan, an erstwhile assistant directors of K. S. Ravikumar wanted to remake the 2019 Malayalam film Android Kunjappan Version 5.25 and approached Ravikumar with an acting role. But the duo was not able to get the producer for the film. Hence Ravikumar agreed to produce the film and bought the remake rights. The principal photography for the film began in January 2021 with the majority of the portions was shot in Tenkasi, Kuttralam and nearby locations. The team planned for a 10-day schedule in a foreign country in April. The film was initially titled as Google Kuttappan and later changed to Koogle Kuttappa.

Music 
Ghibran composed the soundtrack and background score of the film while collaborating with K.S.Ravikumar for second time after Maayavan. The lyrics written by Arivu for the first single "Bomma Bomma", which premiered on 25 December 2021. The second single "Alai Alai", written by Madhan Karky, premiered officially on 21 January 2021.

Release and reception
The film was released in theatres on 6 May 2022.

Praveen Sudevan of The Hindu said, "But for a film that deals with topics that can give us existential worry – old age, loneliness, and AI – it serves up quite a few delightful moments (though it ends on a wistful note)". M.Suganth of The Times of India who gave 2.5 stars out of 5 stars  after reviewing the film stated that "It is mainly the scenes between Subramani and Kuttappa that keep us involved as it is amusing to see this odd couple build their bond". Navein Darshan of Cinema Express who gave 3 stars out of 5 stars after reviewing the film stated that "But when such endearing films, the ones that stress the importance of being there for each other knock on our doors in our own language, how can we not welcome them with open arms?" Behindwoods Review Board of Behindwoods who gave 2.5 stars out of 5 stars after reviewing the film stated that " KS Ravikumar's performance and his chemistry with the robot makes Koogle Kuttappa a watchable emotional film". Siby Jeyya of India Herald said,"Some people believe that classics should not be reproduced, and that watching dubbed versions or the original with subtitles is sufficient".Maalai Malar Critic noted that "Sabari and Saravanan, who worked as assistant directors to director KS Ravikkumar, are directing the film. Instead of telling the story directly, they have made the screenplay by showing the characters around."

Home media
The film is available for streaming on Aha.The satellite rights of the film were sold to Colors Tamil.

References

External links 
 

2022 films
2022 science fiction films
2022 comedy-drama films
2020s science fiction comedy-drama films
2020s Tamil-language films
Indian science fiction comedy-drama films
Tamil remakes of Malayalam films
2022 directorial debut films